Matchbox Pictures is a film and television production company headquartered in Sydney with production houses in Sydney, Melbourne and Singapore. It was formed in 2008 by Tony Ayres, Penny Chapman, Helen Bowden, Michael McMahon and Helen Panckhurst. In 2011, NBCUniversal took a majority stake in Matchbox Pictures, and full ownership by January 2014.

Matchbox Pictures is led by Alastair McKinnon (Managing Director), Matthew Vitins (COO), Debbie Lee (Director of Scripted Development), Penny Chapman (Producer), Helen Panckhurst (Head of Production), Michael McMahon (Producer), and Kate O'Connell (Finance Director).

On 16 July 2018, Matchbox Pictures and NBCUniversal backed co-founder Tony Ayres' new company, Tony Ayres Productions.

Productions 
Current or upcoming productions are listed in bold text.

Film 
 The Home Song Stories (2007)
 Lou (2010)
 The Turning – Cockleshell (2013)
 Cut Snake (2014)
 Nowhere Boys: The Book of Shadows (2016)
 Ali's Wedding (2016)

Television 
 Programs with a shaded background indicate the program is still in production.

References

Film production companies of Australia
Television production companies of Australia
NBCUniversal
Australian subsidiaries of foreign companies
Mass media companies established in 2008
Australian companies established in 2008
Companies based in Sydney
2011 mergers and acquisitions